The Leinster Intermediate Hurling Championship is an inter county competition between the Intermediate Hurling county teams in the province of Leinster. The Leinster Council organizes the series of games.

The winners of the championship each year progress to play the other provincial champions for a chance to win the All-Ireland Intermediate Hurling Championship.

Top winners

Roll of honour

See also
 Munster Intermediate Hurling Championship
 Connacht Intermediate Hurling Championship
 Ulster Intermediate Hurling Championship

References

External links
 Official Roll of Honour from Leinster GAA Website

 2